San Filippo Neri is a baroque-style, Roman Catholic church located in the town of Spoleto, in the province of Perugia, region of Umbria, Italy.

History
The church was begun in 1640, using designs by  Loreto Scelli, and consecrated only in 1724. The stone façade has varied tympani over the doors and windows, and the verticality is accentuated by corinthian pilasters. The interior has paintings by Gaetano Lapis, Sebastiano Conca, Pietro Labruzzi and Francesco Refini.

References

Churches in Spoleto
Baroque architecture in Umbria
16th-century Roman Catholic church buildings in Italy
Roman Catholic churches completed in 1724
1724 establishments in Italy